The following is a list of derecho events.

North America

Europe

South America

Asia

See also 

 Bow echo
 Line echo wave pattern
 List of deadliest Storm Prediction Center days by outlook risk level
 List of microbursts
 List of tornadoes and tornado outbreaks
 Mesoscale convective system and Mesoscale convective complex
 Mesovortex
 Severe thunderstorm
 Squall line
 Straight-line winds
 Tornado

References

External links 
 Derechoes in Europe
 Louisville, KY NWS: Derecho photos from June 16, 2009, outbreak
  NWS: More about the June 16th 2009 Derecho
 Facts About Derechos - Very Damaging Windstorms NOAA: "About Derechos" web page (with illustrations) by the NOAA-NWS-NCEP Storm Prediction Center

Derecho